The Finance Act 2004 (c 12) is an Act of the Parliament of the United Kingdom. It prescribes changes to Excise Duties, Value Added Tax, Income Tax, Corporation Tax, and Capital Gains Tax. It enacts the 2004 Budget speech made by Chancellor of the Exchequer Gordon Brown to the Parliament of the United Kingdom.

In the UK, the Chancellor delivers an annual Budget speech outlining changes in spending, tax and duty. The respective year's Finance Act is the mechanism to enact the changes.

The rules governing the various taxation methods are contained within the various taxation Acts. (For instance Capital Gains Tax Legislation is contained within Taxation of Chargeable Gains Act 1992. The Finance Act details amendments to be made to each one of these Acts.

Notable changes in the 2004 Act included changes to the taxation of UK pensions and provisions to reduce avoidance of inheritance tax.

Pensions Taxation 
One of the main changes introduced by the Act was a change in the taxation of UK pensions from 6 April 2006. Prior to the change many different taxation regimes applied to pension schemes depending on the type of scheme. The changes introduced a single taxation regime.

The principle of the new regime is that a pension fund will be tax-free provided it is below the life time allowance (which was set at £1.5m for the year from 6 April 2006). A second restriction was imposed limiting the maximum annual contribution into a pension scheme.

Although the new regime is simpler, the need to provide transitional arrangements for pension scheme members whose existing entitlements exceed the new limits resulted in the actual implementation being extremely complex.

Inheritance tax 
The Act also introduced an income tax regime known as pre-owned asset tax which aims to reduce the use of common methods of inheritance tax avoidance.

Section 4
The Finance Act 2004 (Duty Stamps) (Appointed Day) Order 2006 (S.I. 2006/201 (C. 3) was made under sections 4(5) and (6).

Section 18
The Finance Act 2004, Section 18 (Appointed Day) Order 2005 (S.I. 2005/2356 (C. 98)) was made under section 18(4).

Section 19
The Finance Act 2004, section 19(1) and Schedule 2, (Appointed Day) Order 2004 (S.I. 2004/1934 (C. 82)) was made under section 19(2)(b).

Section 22
The Finance Act 2004, section 22(2), (Appointed Day) Order 2004 (S.I. 2004/3104 (C. 129)) was made under section 22(6).

Section 53
The Finance Act 2004, Section 53 (Commencement) Order 2004 (S.I. 2004/3268 (C. 147)) was made under section 53(6).

Section 85
The Finance Act 2004, Section 85, (Commencement) Order 2004 (S.I. 2004/1945 (C. 86)) was made under section 85(2).

Section 141
The Finance Act 2004, Section 141 (Appointed Day) Order 2005 (S.I. 2005/123 (C. 6)) was made under sections 141(6) and (7).

Section 291
The Finance Act 2004, section 291, (Appointed Day) Order 2004 (S.I. 2004/1942 (C. 84)) was made under section 291(4).

Section 294
The Finance Act 2004, Section 294 (Appointed Day) Order 2004 (S.I. 2004/2571 (C. 109)) was made under sections 294(4) to (6).

References

External links

United Kingdom Acts of Parliament 2004
2004 in economics
Tax legislation in the United Kingdom